"Nothing in Biology Makes Sense Except in the Light of Evolution" is a 1973 essay by the evolutionary biologist Theodosius Dobzhansky, criticising anti-evolution creationism and espousing theistic evolution. The essay was first published in American Biology Teacher in 1973.

Dobzhansky first used the title statement, in a slight variation, in a 1964 presidential address to the American Society of Zoologists, "Biology, Molecular and Organismic", to assert the importance of organismic biology in response to the challenge of the rising field of molecular biology. The term "light of evolution"—or sub specie evolutionis—had been used earlier by the Jesuit priest and paleontologist Pierre Teilhard de Chardin and then by the biologist Julian Huxley.

Overview 
Dobzhansky opens with a critique of Shaikh Abdul Aziz bin Baz, the then Grand Mufti of Saudi Arabia, for holding a belief based on scripture that the Sun revolves around the Earth. Dobzhansky asserts that "it is ludicrous to mistake the Bible and the Koran for primers of natural science. They treat of matters even more important: the meaning of man and his relations to God." He then criticizes the early English antievolutionist Philip Henry Gosse – who had proposed that fossils were created in the places where they were found – for blasphemously implying that God is deceitful.

As he had said in his earlier presidential address, "If the living world has not arisen from common ancestors by means of an evolutionary process, then the fundamental unity of living things is a hoax and their diversity is a joke."  These two themes of the unity of living things and the diversity of life provide central themes for his essay.

Addressing the diversity of life on Earth, Dobzhansky asks whether God was joking when he created different species for different environments.  This diversity becomes reasonable and understandable, however, if Creation takes place not by the whim of the Creator "but by evolution propelled by natural selection."  He further illustrates this diversity from his own investigation of the widely diverse range of species of fruit flies in Hawaii.  Either the Creator, "in a fit of absent mindedness," created many species of fruit flies in Hawaii, or the fruit flies that arrived on the islands, diversified to fill a wide range of vacant ecological niches.

He illustrates the unity of living things using the molecular sequence of cytochrome C, which Emanuel Margoliash and Walter M. Fitch had shown to be similar in a wide range of species, including monkeys, tuna, kangaroos, and yeast. This unity is further illustrated by the similarity of the embryos of different species.  Either God deliberately arranged things "to mislead sincere seekers of truth" or these similarities are the result of evolution.

Dobzhansky concludes that scripture and science are two different things: "It is a blunder to mistake the Holy Scriptures for elementary textbooks of astronomy, geology, biology, and anthropology."

One response to this paper was a paper by Stephen Dilley, "Nothing in biology makes sense except in light of theology?". This argued that Dobzhansky's arguments all "hinge[d] upon sectarian claims about God’s nature, actions, purposes, or duties"—claims that in Dilley's view required more justification and appeared mutually incompatible.

The underlying theme 
The underlying theme of the essay is the need to teach biological evolution in the context of debate about creation and evolution in public education in the United States. The fact that evolution occurs explains the interrelatedness of the various facts of biology, and so makes biology make sense. The concept has become firmly established as a unifying idea in biology education.

The phrase 
The notion of the "light of evolution" came originally from the vitalist Jesuit priest Pierre Teilhard de Chardin, whom Dobzhansky much admired. In the last paragraph of the article, Dobzhansky quotes from de Chardin's 1955 The Phenomenon of Man:
(Evolution) general condition to which all theories, all hypotheses, all systems must bow and which they must satisfy henceforward if they are to be thinkable and true. Evolution is a light which illuminates all facts, a curve that all lines must follow. (p. 219 of The Phenomenon of Man)

The phrase "nothing in biology makes sense except in the light of evolution" has come into common use by those opposing creationism or its variant called intelligent design. While the essay argues (following de Chardin) that Christianity and evolutionary biology are compatible, a position described as evolutionary creation or theistic evolution, the phrase is also used by those who consider that "in biology" includes anthropology, and those who consider a creator to be unnecessary, such as Richard Dawkins who published The Selfish Gene just three years later.

References

External links 
 PDF as published by The American Biology Teacher, Vol. 35, No. 3 (Mar., 1973)

1973 essays
Evolution and religion
Evolutionary biology literature
Works originally published in American magazines